Stampax is a live album by London-based glam rockers Rachel Stamp. It was released in 2000 on Cruisin' Records. The album was recorded during the band's UK tour in support of their debut album, Hymns for Strange Children

The Album 
Released September 1, 2000 (CRRS 006)

The Stampax album was originally intended to be a live recording of just one gig from the "Hymns for Strange Children Tour", but due to the fans demand for more rare material, the band recorded lots more gigs for the album. Another title proposed for the album was Old Enough to Bleed.

Originally issued as an “Internet Only and Mail Order” release that was only available through the Official Rachel Stamp Website, Stampax wasn’t issued to stores as a single CD until late September 2002. The album was also released as a special bonus CD with the limited edition version of Hymns For Strange Children. It is currently out of print.

Stampax was mastered and edited by Max Bisgrove, who had previously worked with David Bowie & Iggy Pop.

Track listing
 Brand New Toy
 Dead Girl
 Tammy Machine
 True Love
 Madonna... Cher...
 Queen Bee
 Black Tambourine
 Feel Like Makin’ Love
 I Like Girlz
 Girl You’re Just A Slave To Your Man
 Hey Hey Michael You’re Really Fantastic
 Je Suis Maisee
 n.a.u.s.e.a

The live album  features an original take on Bad Company’s “Feel Like Makin’ Love”.

Live outtakes from the album can be found as B-Sides to the "Hey Hey Michael You're Really Fantastic...Live!" CD single and "Monsters of the New Wave" CD and 7" Vinyl singles. These include live versions of "I Got The Worm", "Spank", an early version of "Black Cherry" and a cover of Johnny Kidd and the Pirates' "Please Don't Touch".

Rachel Stamp albums
2000 live albums